Coxlodge was a railway station on the Ponteland Railway, which ran between South Gosforth and Ponteland, with a sub-branch line to Darras Hall. The station served Coxlodge and Fawdon in Newcastle upon Tyne.

The station was opened on 1 June 1905, by the North Eastern Railway. It was situated at the junction of Edgefield Avenue, Fawdon Walk and The Meadows.

The ticket selling statistics in 1911 showed that this was the least popular station on the branch line.

History
The Gosforth and Ponteland Light Railway was formed in 1899, under the Light Railways Act of 1896. Construction of the line by the North Eastern Railway was authorised by Parliament in February 1901.

In March 1905, the 7-mile section from South Gosforth to Ponteland was opened to goods traffic, with passenger services commencing in June 1905.

A 11⁄4-mile extension of the branch line to the garden city of Darras Hall in Northumberland, known as the Little Callerton Railway, was authorised in 1909. Unlike the Gosforth and Ponteland Light Railway, the extension was not constructed as a light railway. Passenger services commenced between Ponteland and Darras Hall in October 1913.

In 1922, the branch line was served by six weekday passenger trains, with an additional train running on Saturday. Only three trains ran through to Darras Hall.

As a result of poor passenger numbers, the station, along with the branch line closed to passengers on 17 June 1929. The station remained open for goods traffic, before closing altogether on 29 November 1965.

Tyne and Wear Metro 

In May 1981, a section of the former branch line was reopened in stages between South Gosforth and Bank Foot, as part of the Tyne and Wear Metro network. The current station at Fawdon is situated near to the site of the former at Coxlodge.

References

External links 

Former North Eastern Railway (UK) stations
Railway stations in Great Britain opened in 1905
Railway stations in Great Britain closed in 1929
1905 establishments in England
1965 disestablishments in England